The Inside is the second full-length album released by alternative rock band Zebra & Giraffe.

Track listing

References

Zebra & Giraffe albums
2010 albums